Chaubara is a tehsil located in Layyah District, in Dera Ghazi Khan Division, Punjab, Pakistan. The market town of Chaubara is the headquarters of the tehsil. The Chaubara Tehsil is the least populated tehsil in Punjab, with a total population of 252,200. Of this total population, residents are divided into rural and urban locations which consists of 80.9% and 19.1% of Chaubara's population respectively.

It is the largest teshil in Layyah District, followed by the Layyah and Karor Lal Esan, all of which total a land area of 6,291 square kilometres.

Union councils 
Tehsil Chaubara consists of 7 union councils i.e. Nawankot, Khaira wala, Jamal Choupre, Shear Garh, Rafique Abad, Aulaq Thal Kalan and Chaubara.

Language
Saraiki and Punjabi are local languages in the region. However, Urdu and English are also spoken in this region.

Occupations
Majority of residents are farmers by profession and raise domestic animals for milk and meat. Small ruminants are a basic source of income, and black and white grams are the most cultivated crops in this area. Wheat and cotton are also grown. This area has potential for forest cultivation since underground water provides favourable conditions.

The proposed Phase-II of the Greater Thal Canal is expected to irrigate a large area of land and improve the local production as well as GDP.

Many people also serve in government jobs in different fields.

Weather
Weather is relatively, hot but nights in the desert of Thal are relatively cold even in summer. Maximum temperature in summer can reach up to 48°C during the day and about 30°C at night. Winter always remain mild except mid December till mid-January.

Desert

A part of Thal Desert falls in the region of Chaubara. The Thal Jeep desert rally and camel dance festival are annual events in the region.

References

External links
DISTRICT AND TEHSIL LEVEL POPULATION SUMMARY WITH REGION BREAKUP. Web.archive.org. (2019). Retrieved 1 April 2021, from https://web.archive.org/web/20180425115403/http://www.pbscensus.gov.pk/sites/default/files/bwpsr/punjab/LAYYAH_SUMMARY.pdf.
Layyah | Punjab Portal. Punjab.gov.pk. (2016). Retrieved 1 April 2021, from https://www.punjab.gov.pk/layyah.

Layyah District
Tehsils of Punjab, Pakistan